Max Müller may refer to:

 (Friedrich) Max Müller (1823–1900), German philologist and orientalist
 Max Müller (Danish army officer) (1808–1884), Danish officer who served in the First and Second Schleswig Wars
 Wilhelm Max Müller (1862–1919), also W. Max Müller, American orientalist, son of Friedrich Max Müller
 Max Ritter von Müller (1887–1918), German World War I fighter ace
 Max Müller (Catholic intellectual) (1906–1994), German philosopher and Catholic intellectual
 Max Müller (cross-country skier) (1916–2019), Swiss cross-country skier
 Max Müller (footballer) (born 1994), German footballer